The 2020 Delaware lieutenant gubernatorial election was held on November 3, 2020, to elect the Lieutenant Governor of Delaware, concurrently with the 2020 U.S. presidential election, as well as elections to the United States Senate and elections to the United States House of Representatives and various state and local elections. Incumbent Democratic Lieutenant Governor Bethany Hall-Long won re-election to a second term.

Democratic primary

Candidates

Nominee
 Bethany Hall-Long, incumbent Lieutenant Governor

Republican primary

Candidates

Nominee
 Donyale Hall, President of the Frederick Douglass Foundation

Declined
 Andy Brockson, real estate agent
 Ernesto Lopez, State Senator

Independent Party of Delaware

Candidates

Withdrew 
 Kevin Baron, veteran

General election

Results

References

2020
Lieutenant Governor
Delaware